Milton Alexander Molina Miguel (born 2 February 1989 in Santa Cruz, Metapán, El Salvador), is a Salvadoran professional footballer.

Club career
Molina has been part of the A.D. Isidro Metapán squad since the Clausura 2009.

Molina scored his first goal for them in the 17th minute in a 3–3 draw against C.D. Vista Hermosa (11 October 2009).

International career
Molina made his debut for El Salvador in January 2011, at the UNCAF Nations Cup match against Honduras.

Honours

Player

Club
A.D. Isidro Metapán
 Primera División
 Champion: Clausura 2010, Apertura 2010, Apertura 2011, Apertura 2013, Clausura 2014, Apertura 2014
 Runners-up: Clausura 2012, Apertura 2012, Clausura 2015

References

External links
 

1989 births
Living people
People from Santa Ana Department
Association football defenders
Salvadoran footballers
El Salvador international footballers
A.D. Isidro Metapán footballers
2011 Copa Centroamericana players
2013 Copa Centroamericana players
2014 Copa Centroamericana players
2015 CONCACAF Gold Cup players
2017 CONCACAF Gold Cup players